Alex Phillip (born July 22, 1989) is an Antiguan footballer who plays for Five Islands in the Antigua and Barbuda Premier Division.

Club career
Phillip began his career in 2009 with Five Islands in the Antiguan First Division. He played only season before joining USL Pro club Antigua Barracuda FC in 2011. He made his Barracuda debut on June 3, 2011 in a 2-1 loss on the road against the Rochester Rhinos.

International career
Phillip made his international debut for the Antigua and Barbuda national team in 2011.

References

External links

1989 births
Living people
Antigua and Barbuda footballers
Antigua and Barbuda international footballers
Antigua Barracuda F.C. players
USL Championship players
Antigua and Barbuda Premier Division players
Five Islands F.C. players
Association football midfielders